Andrea Nugent (born November 1, 1968) is an RMT and Canadian former competition swimmer who specialized in butterfly and freestyle events.  Nugent won the bronze medal with the women's 4x100-metre medley relay team at the 1988 Summer Olympics in Seoul, South Korea, together with Canadian teammates Allison Higson, Jane Kerr and Lori Melien.

See also
 List of Olympic medalists in swimming (women)
 List of Commonwealth Games medallists in swimming (women)

References

External links
 
 
 
 

1968 births
Living people
Canadian female butterfly swimmers
Canadian female freestyle swimmers
Commonwealth Games bronze medallists for Canada
Commonwealth Games gold medallists for Canada
Commonwealth Games silver medallists for Canada
Olympic bronze medalists for Canada
Olympic bronze medalists in swimming
Olympic swimmers of Canada
Swimmers from Montreal
Swimmers at the 1986 Commonwealth Games
Swimmers at the 1988 Summer Olympics
Swimmers at the 1990 Commonwealth Games
Swimmers at the 1992 Summer Olympics
Swimmers at the 1994 Commonwealth Games
Medalists at the 1988 Summer Olympics
Commonwealth Games medallists in swimming
Universiade medalists in swimming
Universiade bronze medalists for Canada
Medalists at the 1991 Summer Universiade
20th-century Canadian women
Medallists at the 1986 Commonwealth Games
Medallists at the 1990 Commonwealth Games
Medallists at the 1994 Commonwealth Games